Rasbora subtilis is a species of ray-finned fish in the genus Rasbora. It occurs only in the Kapuas River in the Indonesian province of West Kalimantan.

References

Rasboras
Freshwater fish of Borneo
Taxa named by Tyson R. Roberts
Fish described in 1989